Trostyanka is a rural locality (a selo) and the administrative center of Trostyanskoye Rural Settlement, Yelansky District, Volgograd Oblast, Russia. The population was 551 in 2010. There are six streets.

Geography 
Trostyanka is located on Khopyorsko-Buzulukskaya Plain, on the right bank of the Buzuluk River, 26 km southwest of Yelan (the district's administrative centre) by road. Rovinsky is the nearest rural locality.

References 

Rural localities in Yelansky District